Lower Pacific Heights, also known as Upper Fillmore, is a neighborhood in San Francisco, California, between Pacific Heights, the Fillmore District, Laurel Heights, and Japantown. The neighborhood is centered on the commercial corridor of Fillmore Street between California and Post streets, with California Street to the north, Geary Boulevard to the south, Presidio Avenue to the west, and Van Ness Avenue to the east. 

Historically, the area was part of the Western Addition. Long a middle-class neighborhood geographically and socially intermediate between Pacific Heights and the Lower Fillmore, the area became wealthier and more upscale with the escalation of San Francisco property values in the 1980s and 1990s, when the designation "Upper Fillmore" fell out of favor and "Lower Pacific Heights" came into increased use.

References

Neighborhoods in San Francisco
Western Addition, San Francisco